The Antonio Narro Agrarian Autonomous University or Universidad Autónoma Agraria Antonio Narro in Spanish (UAAAN) is a public university in Mexico dedicated to the Agricultural, Silvicultural, Animal Production, food and Environmental Sciences. The Antonio Narro Agrarian Autonomous University is one of the most important agricultural college of America Latina and the "Narro" have national and international recognition in the agricultural and animal industry and the high academic level. There is also a campus in Torreón, Coahuila. It is also called "Universidad Antonio Narro" for short, or simply, "La Narro". In 2008 the UAAAN has an enrollment of about 4,500 students in both campuses, all in agriculture and related sciences.

History 
The Antonio Narro Agrarian Autonomous University (UAAAN) was founded on March 4, 1923, after the philanthropist Antonio Narro Rodríguez donated his Buenavista Estate for a public agricultural university, which became the "Regional School of Agriculture Antonio Narro".  The main objective of this university consisted on preparing young people in a professional discipline of agricultural work in the field.  Two months before dying on September 24, 1912, Antonio Narro Rodriguez had bequeathed a substantial part of its personal fortune: his property in Buenavista and $22,000 Mexican pesos, the value of six urban properties in the city of Saltillo, for constituting a school of agriculture.

Over the years, the university college changed its name several times. In 1938, it became the Superior School of Agriculture (Escuela Superior de Agricultura); by 1957, then became a founding institution of the University of Coahuila. In 1975, it became Antonio Narro Agrarian Autonomous University by a decree of the Coahuila state congress.  Finally, in 2006, UAAAN was recognized as a Federal University, through a decree approved by the House of Representatives, the Senators Chamber and published in the federal registry by the President of Mexico, April 26, 2006.

In the 1990s, the university built and signed on a radio station, XESAL-AM 1220.

Shield 
The emblem that carries the Universidad Autónoma Agraria Antonio Narro expresses the ancestral eagle of Mexico, holding in its talons the spike of wheat as a symbol of life and bread. It holds the wisdom (represented by the owl) surrounded by clouds (rain) that  germinate the seed. Wisdom stands on the plough and the land. Mind and force together for a single purpose: the love of mother earth (Alma Terra Mater), for the life of man.

Mascot 
In the same year he was born the team mascot is looking for the same, one day, after an intense practice, team members began to eat with great appetite, which made someone cry "... They eat like vultures ... ". Students found in this bird similar to the colors "black and gold" (some vultures are black, some are white-yellowish neck) also has claw vulture, which was characteristic of the founding team, and lives in the mountains while the school is located in the foothills of the majestic Sierra de Zapalinamé and guarded by a jealous guardian: "EI Old Picacho," San Lorenzo Canyon. Thus was born "the Vultures" so much tradition.

Physical setting 
Climate at the main (Saltillo) campus of the UAAAN is dry semicalid; there are occasional freezes. Temperature seldom  drops below  (once in some years). Natural vegetation is short Chihuahuan desert brush of several species of Acacia; there are also Yucca spp., lechuguilla (Agave lechuguilla), creosotebush (Larrea tridentata), mesquite (Prosopis), and granjeno (Celtis).

Facilities 
The main (Saltillo) campus of the UAAAN occupies more than 4 square kilometres in a fertile valley a few kilometres south of the city of Saltillo on the Zacatecas highway. A substantial amount of this land is occupied by experimental and demonstrative plots including annual and perennial crops like: corn, wheat, triticale; vegetables such as temperate (Cruciferae: broccoli, cabbage), warm-season (Solanaceae: peppers, tomatoes), and others (squash, cilantro, onions, garlic, etc.); pecan and pistachio orchards; greenhouses (growing vegetables and ornamentals). All agriculture must use irrigation; there is no dryland agriculture. The university also includes animal production facilities (barns for intensive rearing of pigs, cows, goats, and dairy cows, mainly) including fistulated cattle.

The UAAAN has several agricultural experimental fields across Mexico, encompassing climates from the wet tropics (Veracruz) to the Chihuahuan desert: Ocampo, Coahuila state; Matehuala, San Luis Potosi state (cactus botanical garden); Noria de Guadalupe, Zacatecas state; Cuencamé, Durango state. Also, in the Sierra Madre Oriental valleys: Navidad, Nuevo Leon (potato), and Los Lirios, Coahuila state (apple).

Structure and academic programs 
The Dirección de Licenciatura (Undergraduate Office) manages the 4-5 year undergraduate majors including  Ingeniero Agrónomo and majors in Horticultura,  Producción,  Parasitólogía, Forestal, Agrobiología, Zootecnia, Ciencia y Tecnología de Alimentos, Administración Agrícola, Desarrollo Rural,Mecánico Agrícola, Irrigación, Agrícola y Ambiental,  Procesos Ambientales, Agroecología, Lic en Economia Agrícola y Agronegiocios, Medicina Veterinaria and others. . The Direccion General Academica  oversees international student programs, exchanges and stays.

Graduate programs 
The Dirección de Posgrado (Graduate Office) directs  Graduate programs include
ing the Professional Master's on Seed Technology, and the Master's and Doctorates on Plant Breeding, Agrarian Sciences, Production Systems Engineering, Animal Sciences, and Plant Protection or Agricultural Parasitology. Most of these programs are considered " Excellency Graduate Programs" by the National Council of Science and technology (CONACYT) [www.conacyt.mx].

International students
International student presence at the university has been steady. In recent years, students from Bolivia, Colombia, Ecuador, Paraguay, Panama, France, Ghana, Japan, Taiwan, Thailand, Nicaragua and the United States have attended the school.

Cultural diffusion 
The Universidad Autónoma Agraria Antonio Narro counts with different groups like cultural, civic, and artistics.

Civic groups
 Band of War (Mixed)
 Listen Femenil
 Listen manly
 Listen to the frog (Ranchito's Bar)

Cultural groups
 Group Painting "Huitzlin"
 Grupo de Lenguas Indígenas
 "Chahahualztnin"

Arts
 Rondalla de Saltillo
 University Rondalla
 Mexican Regional Music
 Latin music band "Tierra Mestiza"
 Rock Group "ethyl"
 Folkloric Dance Group "Macehualiztli"
 Modern Dance Group "The Brotherhood"

Cultural workshops
 Dance Workshop
 Visual Arts Workshop
 Guitar Workshop
 Accordion workshop por las Janes

Sports teams 
Since its inception as an institution of agricultural education in 1923, the Narro is concerned that, simultaneously with the academic, professional theoretical and practical wrought here, go also as part of its physical development through sport help to the formation of his character.

In the early years of the Regional School of Agriculture then young students, in addition to having to work in the garden, the garden, the barn, the poultry and agricultural fields, were required to make physical education-practice a sport-, which was intended they were in good health

UAAAN currently has the following sports disciplines:

 Football Soccer
 Basketball
 Rodeo
 Charreria
 Athletics
 Baseball
 American Football
 Boxing
 Tae Kwon Do
 Tochito Flag
 Softball
 Volleyball
 Athletics
 Soccer Uruguay
 Extreme Sport (copy)

Laguna Unit
The perimeter of the campus is fenced in its entirety, giving privacy and control. It has a modern and functional infrastructure that supports the activities of the teaching-learning process, consists of 42 classrooms, 20 laboratories, cubicles for teachers, sports facilities, dining room, a central library and an auditorium with capacity for 150 people.
As student support services are available as internship, residency feminine, dining, transportation, nursing, language center, computer center and sports

History of Laguna Unit
The UAAAN-UL emerged from what was School of Veterinary Medicine of the Laguna, A. C., established in April 1975. This school emerged, in turn, from the merger of the schools of Veterinary Medicine of San Pedro de las Colonias and Torreón, Coahuila.

Academic programs of Laguna Unit
 Agronomist Parasitologist
 Horticulture Agronomist
 Irrigation Agronomist
 Agroecology Engineer
 Environmental Processes Engineer
 Doctor of Veterinary Medicine

Doctor of Veterinary Medicine (DVM)
The Doctor of Veterinary Medicine or DVM Program ("Medico Veterinario Zootecnista" in Spanish)
It offers an excellent level academic labs and small species are to coarse, as well as labs in large species, Puesto that is located in the Lagoon Region (Torreón Municipality, Gómez Palacio Municipality, Lerdo Municipality), where it is the biggest dairy production in México, bell across America, without telling them of poultry farms, pigs and fattening bovine meat production.

In the Laguna Region (Torreón Municipality, Gómez Palacio Municipality, Lerdo Municipality) are major food companies such as:

 Pill´sGrim
 Lala
 MUMA
 MUR
 Bachoco
 Chilchota
 Nupplen

They have a wide variety of practices in different field pets.

DVM Program mission is to prepare quality and high standards. This race has 10 semesters spread over five years.

External links
 Admission to graduate programs
 Official website
 Student Services and Enrollment

Universidad Autónoma Agraria Antonio Narro
Forestry education
Educational institutions established in 1923
1923 establishments in Mexico